George Sinabulya is an Anglican bishop who served in Uganda: he was the inaugural Bishop of Central Buganda, serving from 1995 to 2001.

His son Michael is the third and current Bishop of Central Buganda.

References

21st-century Anglican bishops in Uganda
20th-century Anglican bishops in Uganda
Living people
Year of birth missing (living people)
Anglican bishops of Central Buganda